Šmerlis is a forest in Riga, Latvia.  It is home to Riga Film Studio.  Šmerlis can be accessed by trolleybus routes 4 and 16, as well as tram routes 1,3, and 6. Šmerlis is also the site of the only remaining Jewish cemetery in Riga.

See also 
Bikernieki Memorial

References 

Geography of Riga
Forests of Latvia